NewLove is a computer virus that infects Microsoft Windows 98, and Microsoft Windows 2000, Windows 95 users also running Internet Explorer 5.0. The virus spreads by e-mail and takes the name of a recently accessed file on a user's computer and uses that name. NewLove targets every single file on a user's hard drive until the computer stops working. The virus causes more damage than ILOVEYOU because it sneaks around virus scanners. In 2000, many media outlets updated Americans on the virus, but the virus did not cause as much damage as people expected.

References

Email worms